Tila may refer to:

 Tila, Jumla, rural municipality in Karnali province, Nepal
 Tila (moth), a genus of moth in the family Gelechiidae
 Tila Nguyen, internet celebrity and model better known as Tila Tequila
 Truth in Lending Act, United States law commonly abbreviated TILA
 Tila, Chiapas, a town in southern Mexico
 Tila, Raebareli, a village in Uttar Pradesh, India